Valea Largă (formerly Țicud; ,) is a commune in Mureș County, Transylvania, Romania that is composed of nine villages: Grădini, Mălăești, Poduri, Valea Frăției (Frátaipatak), Valea Glodului, Valea Largă, Valea Pădurii, Valea Șurii and Valea Urieșului (Uries). It has a population of 3,379: 98% Romanians, 1.5% Roma and 0.5% others.

See also
List of Hungarian exonyms (Mureș County)

References

Communes in Mureș County
Localities in Transylvania